Alex Nascimento Fernandes (born 3 June 2002) is a Brazilian professional footballer who plays as a midfielder for Bulgarian club Cherno More Varna.

Career
Alex started his career Portuguesa Santista, moving to Atlético Mineiro and in 2020 he joined Santos. On 7 July 2022, he moved to the Bulgarian First League team Cherno More. Fernandes scored one of the goals for the second team in the local league derby against Spartak Varna II in Third League. He complete his professional debut for the first team on 6 August 2022 in a league win against Beroe.

Career statistics

References

External links
 

2002 births
Living people
Brazilian footballers
PFC Cherno More Varna players
First Professional Football League (Bulgaria) players
Association football midfielders